Leeroy Jenkins is a player character created by Ben Schulz in Blizzard Entertainment's MMORPG World of Warcraft. The character became popular in 2005 from his role in a viral video of game footage where, having been absent during his group's discussion of a meticulous plan, Leeroy returns and ruins it by charging straight into combat while shouting his own name as a battle cry. The video capturing the character's behavior became an Internet meme. As a result of positive reception to the meme, Blizzard subsequently added Leeroy Jenkins into World of Warcraft as an official non-player character and as a minion card and later as a hero in the online card game Hearthstone.

Video 
The original video, titled Leeroy!!, was released by the World of Warcraft player guild "Pals for Life" to video-sharing site Warcraftmovies on May 11, 2005. The video features a group of players discussing a detailed battle plan for their next encounter while Leeroy is away from his computer, preparing a plate of chicken. This plan is intended to help Leeroy obtain a piece of armor from the boss monsters, but is ruined when Leeroy himself returns and, ignorant of the strategy, immediately rushes headlong into battle shouting his own name in a stylized battle cry. His companions rush to help, but Leeroy's actions ruin the detailed plan and all the members of the group are killed.

The Internet meme started with the release of the video clip called A Rough Go to the World of Warcraft game forum in a thread titled "UBRS (vid) Rookery Overpowered! blue plz.", which presented the video in a serious context. The thread requested that other players provide help with strategy and that Blizzard reduce the difficulty of the encounter. The video spread as an Internet meme, and Leeroy's response to the other players' chastisements, "at least I have chicken", was also much mimicked.

Origin 

When in April 2008 he was asked about his actions in the video by National Public Radio, Ben Schulz said the players "were drinking 40s and just yelling at each other." As time went on, some began suggesting that the video may have been staged. Schulz had refused to confirm or deny whether the video was staged. Later, in December 2017, Schulz, along with Ben "Anfrony" Vinson, the cameraman of the video, released what he described as a first take/dry run of the video. Regarding the video, Vinson stated, "We didn't think anyone would believe it was real, we thought it was so obviously satire."

Merchandise 
The character was included as a card within the World of Warcraft Trading Card Game released on October 25, 2006, with art by Mike Krahulik of Penny Arcade fame. A "Leeroy Jenkins" Legendary card was later released in Blizzard's online card game Hearthstone, as part of the game's base ("Classic") set, using the same art as that of the WoW Trading Card Game.

Upper Deck Entertainment released a World of Warcraft Miniatures game in fall 2008, which included a Leeroy Jenkins figurine.

Reaction 
The May 2005 issue of PC Gamer UK featured an article on the video, titled "The Ballad of Leeroy Jenkins". The article took the position that the video was designed as a negative commentary on the kind of "nerd-guilds" whose members fastidiously plan raids with all the seriousness of actual military tacticians. They added that they felt Leeroy is the hero acting against the geekiness of his guild. In a 2009 article in the Armed Forces Journal titled "Let's Do This!: Leeroy Jenkins and the American Way of Advising," Capt. Robert M Chamberlain links Jenkins to the American approach to advising the indigenous armed forces in Iraq. IGN placed Jenkins 10th on their 2017 list of best Blizzard characters, noting that he represents the crossing of a line which typically separates a game's content and its community.

In 2008, Blizzard added an achievement to World of Warcraft called "Leeeeeeeeeeeeeroy!", which awards the title of "Jenkins" to players who kill 50 of the rookery whelps from the video within 15 seconds. In the 2014 Warlords of Draenor expansion, Leeroy appears as a non-player character. Blizzard also added a "Leeroy Jenkins" card to their popular online card game Hearthstone. In March 2022, Leeroy Jenkins debuted as a playable mercenary character in Hearthstone's Mercenaries game mode.

Jenkins has also been referenced in popular culture outside of World of Warcraft, including a question on Jeopardy!, mentions on television programs such as How I Met Your Mother and Barry, and appearances in video games not developed or published by Blizzard, such as Mass Effect. During the prolonged vote for the Speaker of the House of the 118th United States Congress in January 2023, Representative Jared Huffman evoked the meme when voting for candidate Hakeem Jeffries.

References

External links 
 

2000s in Internet culture
Internet humor
Internet memes introduced in 2005
Machinima
Video game memes
Internet memes
Viral videos
Warcraft characters
Video game characters introduced in 2005
Fictional knights
Fictional swordfighters in video games